(born January 9, 1971) is a Japanese video game art director and character designer who worked for Square Enix (formerly Square). A former member of Toaplan, Naora served as the art director for several Final Fantasy and Compilation of Final Fantasy VII titles. He also served as the producer of the Code Age franchise. On October 1, 2016 he announced on Twitter that he had left the company, but would continue to contribute to Square Enix games as a freelancer.

Biography

Final Fantasy X
Naora described the game as a "journey", and the Besaid Village from the game was heavily influenced by his trip to Bali, Indonesia, where he saw seaside towns, temples, people handing out tropical flowers, and distinctive dress.

Code Age Commanders
Naora worked on the game Code Age Commanders for three years, in cooperation with a group he assembled for this project called "War Head". The game was conceived to be a new game, unlike Final Fantasy, and could be made into a game for the PlayStation 2, a manga, and a cell phone game. Some of the drawing is done by Naora himself. In order to simulate the nature of two handed combat, multiple buttons are utilized in combat. The game was designed to appeal to the western desire for game customization.

The Last Remnant
Naora took note of the popularity of Fallout 3, and the growing differences between Japanese and Western RPGs. He then undertook to compare the two styles to appeal to both audiences. Naora developed the game "from the ground up" to appeal to both Japanese and Western audiences, and undertook extensive customer research into American gaming desires and tastes.

Final Fantasy Type-0
Naora was on a staff of three for Type-0 in 2006, but development began in 2008 due to ongoing work on Crisis Core: Final Fantasy VII, and even then not fully until 2009 due to The 3rd Birthday. Naora worked to create the backstory for the game, and the built up the fourteen characters life stories. He developed the country designs and the main game visuals. It was the longest he had ever worked on a single game.

Crystal Conquest
Naora was the art director for Crystal Conquest.

Final Fantasy X Remaster
Naora outlined the focus of the Final Fantasy X Remaster from an artistic perspective as being color correction, fixing errors and increasing the games resolution.

Final Fantasy XV
Having worked on the game since its title was changed, Naora was very excited and nervous creating a trailer for the game to appear on copies of Final Fantasy Type-0 HD.

Other Activities
Naora delivered a lecture in 2015 at SMU Guildhall college entitled "The Visual Evolution of Final Fantasy" where he discussed the visual changes from creating with pixel graphics to 3D characters.

Games
Grind Stormer (1993) - Art director
Final Fantasy VI (1994) - Field graphic designer
Chrono Trigger (1995) - Field graphic designer
Treasure Conflix (1996) - Visual designer
Final Fantasy VII (1997) - Art director
Final Fantasy VIII (1999) - Art director
Vagrant Story (2000) - Accessories designer (CGI intro movie)
The Bouncer (2000) - Art supervisor
Final Fantasy X (2001) - Art director
Unlimited Saga (2002) - Art director
Front Mission 4 (2003) - Character designer
Before Crisis: Final Fantasy VII (2004) - Art director
Romancing SaGa: Minstrel Song (2005) - Art director
Final Fantasy VII: Advent Children (2005) - Art director
Code Age Commanders (2005) - Producer, Art director, Story
Code Age Brawls (2005) - Producer, Art director, Story
Front Mission 5: Scars of the War (2005) - Character designer
Dirge of Cerberus: Final Fantasy VII (2006) - Art supervisor
Crisis Core: Final Fantasy VII (2007) - Art supervisor
Song Summoner: The Unsung Heroes (2008) - Character designer
The Last Remnant (2008) - Art producer, Character designer
Lufia: Curse of the Sinistrals (2010) - Character designer
Chaos Rings (2010) - Character designer
Chaos Rings Omega (2011) - Character designer
Chaos Rings II (2011) - Character designer
Final Fantasy Type-0 (2011) - Art director
Final Fantasy X/X-2 HD Remaster (2013) - Supervisor
Final Fantasy Type-0 HD (2015) - Art director
Cosmos Rings (2016) - Key visual arts
Final Fantasy XV (2016) - Art director

References

External links

Yusuke Naora profile, interviews, and photo gallery at the Square Haven People Database

Living people
1971 births
Final Fantasy designers
Japanese art directors
Square Enix people